Alnavar is a panchayat town in the Dharwad district in Karnataka, India. "" was the ancient name of "Alnavar." C M Nimbannavar is the MLA of the town.
It is known for its wood factory and wood industries. Being a small town it has a railway junction which comes under south western railway lines of India. Some of the places to visit are dandeli which has its own forest.

Geography
It has an average elevation of 563 metres (1847 feet). Trains from Bangalore to Vasco da Gama passes through this town.

Demographics
 India census, Alnavar had a population of 16,286. Males constitute 51% of the population and females constitute 49%. Alnavar has an average literacy rate of 67%, higher than the national average of 59.5%, with 56% of the males and 44% of females literate. 13% of the population is under 6 years of age. Kannada, Hindi & Marathi are the most widely spoken languages. 

As per 2011, the census population is 17228.

References

Cities and towns in Dharwad district